In mathematics, the principal ideal theorem of class field theory, a branch of algebraic number theory, says that extending ideals gives a mapping on the class group of an algebraic number field to the class group of its Hilbert class field, which sends all ideal classes to the class of a principal ideal. The phenomenon has also been called principalization, or sometimes capitulation.

Formal statement
For any algebraic number field K and any ideal I of the ring of integers of K, if L is the Hilbert class field of K, then

is a principal ideal αOL, for OL the ring of integers of L and some element  α in it.

History

 reduced the principal ideal theorem to a question about finite abelian groups: he showed that it would follow if the transfer from a finite group to its derived subgroup is trivial. This result was proved by Philipp Furtwängler (1929).

References

 
 

  

Ideals (ring theory)
Group theory
Homological algebra
Theorems in algebraic number theory